Andreozzi is an Italian surname, derived from the given name Andrea. Notable people with the surname include:

Alessandro Andreozzi (born 1991), Italian motorcycle racer
Guido Andreozzi (born 1991), Argentine tennis player
Silvestro Andreozzi (1575–1648), Roman Catholic prelate who served as Bishop of Penne e Atri (1621–1648)

Italian-language surnames
Patronymic surnames
Surnames from given names